J.R. Belcher was a Canadian diplomat. He was Representative to the International Civil Aviation Organization.

External links 
 Foreign Affairs and International Trade Canada Complete List of Posts 

Canadian diplomats
Year of birth missing
1992 deaths
International Civil Aviation Organization people